Eugène Ryter (23 March 1890 – 8 March 1973) was a Swiss weightlifter who competed in the 1920 Summer Olympics. In 1920 he won the bronze medal in the featherweight class.

References

External links
Eugène Ryter's profile at Sports Reference.com

1890 births
1973 deaths
Swiss male weightlifters
Olympic weightlifters of Switzerland
Weightlifters at the 1920 Summer Olympics
Olympic bronze medalists for Switzerland
Olympic medalists in weightlifting
Medalists at the 1920 Summer Olympics